"It's No Crime" is a 1989 song written and performed by Babyface.  The single was Babyface's first entry on the Hot 100 as a solo artist, peaking at number seven and reaching number one on the Hot Black Singles chart.  The single was Babyface's only chart entry on the dance charts, where it peaked at number five.

Charts

Weekly charts

Year-end charts

References

1989 singles
Babyface (musician) songs
Songs written by Babyface (musician)
Songs written by L.A. Reid
Songs written by Daryl Simmons
Song recordings produced by Babyface (musician)
Columbia Records singles
Epic Records singles
1989 songs
Song recordings produced by L.A. Reid
Song recordings produced by Daryl Simmons
SOLAR Records singles